Charles Peck (1873 - 1941) was a British racehorse trainer. He was Champion Trainer in 1915.

References 

British racehorse trainers
1873 births
1941 deaths